Jack L. Swartz (March 31, 1930 – July 11, 1997) was an American football coach.  He served as the head football coach at Wheaton College in Wheaton, Illinois for eight seasons, from 1961 to 1968, compiling a record of 41–30.

Swartz died at his home in Wheaton in 1997. At the time of his death he was still on the faculty of Wheaton College, serving as associate athletic director.

References

1930 births
1997 deaths
Wheaton Thunder football coaches
Sportspeople from Flint, Michigan